Sher Mohammad (born 11 February 1936) is an Indian former cricketer. He played first-class cricket for Delhi and Maharashtra between 1954 and 1966.

See also
 List of Delhi cricketers

References

External links
 

1936 births
Living people
Indian cricketers
Delhi cricketers
Maharashtra cricketers
Cricketers from Pune